Francisco Javier Caamaño Rojas (born 11 December 1989) is a Chilean political activist who was elected as a member of the Chilean Constitutional Convention.

References

External links
 BCN Profile

Living people
1990 births
Chilean activists
People from Santiago
21st-century Chilean politicians
Members of the List of the People
Members of the Chilean Constitutional Convention